The 1881 Welsh Cup Final, was the fourth in the football competition. It was contested by Druids and Newtown White Star at the Racecourse Ground, Wrexham.

Route to the Final

Druids

Newtown White Star

Final

References

1881
1880–81 in Welsh football
Druids F.C. matches